SAISD may refer to:
San Angelo Independent School District
San Antonio Independent School District